The 2019 Men's European Volleyball League was the 16th edition of the annual Men's European Volleyball League, which featured men's national volleyball teams from twenty European countries.
For the second season, the tournament had two groups: the Golden League, featuring twelve teams, and the Silver League, featuring eight teams.

It also acted as the European qualifying competition for the 2019 FIVB Volleyball Men's Challenger Cup, securing two vacancies for the tournament that then served as the qualifying competition for the cancelled 2020 FIVB Volleyball Men's Nations League.

Pools composition

Golden League

Silver League

League round
All times are local.

Golden League

Pool A

|}

|}

Pool B

|}

|}

Pool C

|}

|}

Silver League

Pool A

|}

|}

Pool B 

|}

|}

Final round

Silver League
All times are local.

Final

|}

Leg 1

|}

Leg 2

|}

Golden League
Venue:  Saku Suurhall, Tallinn, Estonia
All times are Eastern European Summer Time (UTC+03:00).

Semifinals

|}

3rd place match

|}

Final

|}

Final standing

Awards 
Most Valuable Player
 Arslan Ekşi

See also
2019 Women's European Volleyball League

References

External links
Official website of the Golden League
Official website of the Silver League

European Volleyball League
Europe
2019 FIVB Volleyball Men's Challenger Cup qualification
European Volleyball League Men
European Volleyball League Men
2019 in Estonian sport
International volleyball competitions hosted by Estonia